Steven Glynn Novak (born May 26, 1949) is an American politician in the state of Minnesota.

Novak graduated from Mounds View  High School in Mounds View, Minnesota. Novak lived in New Brighton, Minnesota with his wife and family. He went to Hamline University and then received his bachelor's degree in political science from University of Minnesota Duluth. Novak worked as a sales representative. He served in the Minnesota House of Representatives and the Minnesota Senate.

References

Democratic Party Minnesota state senators
Democratic Party members of the Minnesota House of Representatives
1949 births
Living people
People from New Brighton, Minnesota
Businesspeople from Minnesota
Hamline University alumni
University of Minnesota Duluth alumni